November's Chopin is the sixth studio album by Taiwanese singer Jay Chou, released on 1 November 2005 by Alfa Music.

The album was nominated for two Golden Melody Awards. The album won for an IFPI Hong Kong Top Sales Music Award for Top 10 Best Selling Mandarin Albums of the Year. The track, "Drifting", was nominated a Golden Horse Award for Best Original Film Song and a Hong Kong Film Award for Best Original Film Song.

Track listing

Awards

References

External links
  Jay Chou discography@JVR Music

2005 albums
Jay Chou albums
Sony Music Taiwan albums